Southwestern Istrian, also known as Chakavian-Shtokavian, Shtokavian-Chakavian, or Shtakavian-Chakavian ikavian, is one of the dialects of the Chakavian language in Istria, Croatia. Through the history there were different hypothesis which classified it, besides in Chakavian, instead in Shtokavian, because it is a transitional dialect. It is the most widespread Chakavian dialect in Istria.

Origin and history
The subdialect is a mixture of Chakavian and Shtokavian elements. It is considered that it emerged in Istria after the 16th-century migration of speakers who originated from Dalmatia, mainly from the hinterland of Makarska Riviera where mostly was spoken Shtokavian dialect of Ikavian pronunciation with Chakavian characteristics, which with emigration and consolidation of speakers on the Šibenik-Zadar territory assimilated additional Chakavian elements. It is considered that the place of origination was not situated at the sea, but also not very far from it.

The emigration was caused by the Ottoman conquest of Western Balkans, and immigration in Istria was conducted by Venice Republic due to poor population density after late medieval de-population of the peninsula. It is argued that the territory around Zadar (Ravni Kotari) was only an intermediate station for the migration to Istria. To this subdialect is related Slavomolisano dialect of Molise Croats from Zabiokovlje, although it has less Chakavian elements. In different territories there exist different dialects transitions and boundaries, and with its origination from Dalmatian-Herzegovinian region in which initially prevailed Shtokavian elements while later and present-day Chakavian elements, it can be considered as a postmigrational or transitional subdialect.

According to the linguist Josip Ribarić, the Chakavian elements cannot be interpreted with the neighborhood of native Chakavian speakers in Istria because Northern Chakavian subdialect does not have these elements, and as such in the Southwestern Istrian dialect was "saved reflection of the Shtokavian-Chakavian dialect spoken at the end of the 15th, during the 16th and the first half of the 17th century spoke on the Dalmatian mainland". According to philologist Lina Pliško, "the main language layer features Ikavian Chakavian from Zadar hinterland, but were also preserved features of assimilated Ikavian Štakavian speakers originating from Makarska (Podbiokovlje) region, who arrived to Istria in a migrational wave with Ikavian Chakavian speakers, and in more-or-less number also language features of Ekavian Chakavian speakers (Northern Chakavian, Buzet, and partly Middle Chakavian subdialect).

The subdialect was first mentioned by Ribarić in 1916. In the second half of the 20th century, to the dialect was attributed a larger number of Shtokavian elements and hence was also classified among Shtokavian Ikavian subdialects, a thesis first argued by Polish linguist Mieczysław Małecki (1930), which was mostly supported by Serbian linguists, Aleksandar Belić, Pavle Ivić and Radosav Bošković. However, a comprehensive research made by Mate Hraste in 1964 held for determination of Shtokavian languages in Istria found that Southwestern Istria "is not Shtokavian nor Shtokavian-Chakavian, as was called by Ribarić, but Chakavian-Shtokavian, because in it even today prevail Chakavian elements, and not Shtokavian. Shtokavian is only Premantura, Banjole, Vintijan, Vinkuran and Valdebek, although even in those places there are Čakavian adstrata which was introduced from the hinterland during the centuries to the present day. The language of all these places even today is mostly Chakavian". According to it, and work by Dalibor Brozović, Ivić in 1981 argued that if the subdialect is classified among Chakavian subdialects it belongs to the Chakavian subdialects of the Southeastern group.

Speaking area

According to Pliško, the subdialect is spoken "from the very South (Premantura), along the Western coast of Istria until the delta of river Mirna (Tar), along Eastern line Muntrilj – Kringa – Sveti Petar u Šumi – Kanfanar until Sveti Ivan in Višnjan, along Western coast of river Raša until Barban, then line Rakalj – Marčana – Muntić – Valtura – and South Jadreški – Šišan – Ližnjan – Medulin". To this subdialect also belongs the so-called Vodice oasis of ten villages (Vodice, Jelovice, Dane, Trstenik, Rašpor, Črnehi located in municipality of Lanišće, and Golac, Brdo, Gojaki, Zagrad in municipality of Hrpelje-Kozina) in Northeastern part of Istria (Ćićarija), located in Croatia and Slovenia, which was described by Ribarić.

It can be divided into smaller units: the main area in the Southwest, Premantura area in the South, and Vodice oasis in the Northeast. From the prosody perspective of accent, rhythm, intonation, etc., it can be divided into typological areas: central, border, northwestern, Vodice oasis, southern.

Main features
In this subdialect the yat is i (Ikavian): lip, divojka, mriža, srića, in comparison to Shtokavian Ijekavian lijep, djevojka, mreža, sreća. It has little Ekavian which is mainly a borrowing from neighbouring Istrian Chakavian subdialects or from Slovenes dialects. It is mostly Shtakavian ("ognjište", "dažditi"), but it is not generally because Shchakavian examples are not rare. Chakavian features are partly of Southeastern and Southwestern type, brought and received in Istria.

Josip Lisac quotes these features; "sequence w + semitone give partly u- in Shtokavian way, which is also in Chakavian Southeast, for e.g. u, unuki. Partly is Vazam 'Uskrs', vajka 'uvijek', valje 'odmah', and that is Chakavian result, specifically Northwestern Chakavian subdialects. Dočetno -l mainly regularly gives a, which is Shtokavian feature, however, it is also well represented in Chakavian under strong influence of Shtokavian. Especially interesting are reflexes prsl. ď, was it j, đ, ď, ž, also type mlajži. Example of type mlaži actually are Shtokavian result (dž) spoken in a Chakavian way. J is Chakavian represented in many Western Shtokavian dialects. Phoneme h mainly is well conserved, but there are also deviations ... Usually, it is everywhere except around Premantura conserved čr-, as it is common in Chakavian, exceptionally in Shtokavian. Usually are a regular short plural of single-word nouns of masculinity, as it is in Chakavian and Kajkavian, sometimes also in Shtokavian. Generally is said for e.g. dva kantuna, tri kantuni, četiri kantuni, as it is common in Chakavian. Characteristically are substitute words ča i zašto, ča probably as acquired feature, zašto as old. Distinct Chakavian element bin, biš, bi, bimo, bite, bi characterize the subdialect, even in Premantura in the South there's bimo and bite". Accentuation is different depending on the place although there are some common features. It has a three-tone system, while in the area of Vodice oasis is two tonic (except in the village of Trstenik where is one tonic, similar to the Buzet dialect).

According to general features, it is part of a dialectical continuum and the encounter of Western Shtokavian and Southern Chakavian, with several divisions within the subdialect older than the 16th-century migration to Istria. According to Lisac, it was primarily formed "in the hinterland of Makarska Riviera. That's the territory where predominantly was spoken Shtokavian, slightly Chakavian, and main features are Štakavism and "-a" in verb adjective in working, along non-Neoshtokavian accentuation ... The place of origination was not located by the sea (because it would be Shchakavian), but also not very far from the sea (because it would have "-l" instead of "-a").

Lexicon 
It has more Italianisms (kampanja "polje", korta "dvorište") than in Dalmatia. Toward North of Istria and the boundary with Slovenian language area it also has some Germanisms (žajfa "sapun", gmajna "pašnjak mjesne općine"). The lexicon generally indicates to a common origin nevertheless on separated majority in Southwest and Vodice oasis in Northeast. There's a visible closeness to the dialect of Molise Croats in Italy. Vodice oasis also has some innovations recorded in Northern Chakavian, Burgenland Croatian, Kajkavian and Slovene dialects, but there are also many Chakavian autochthonisms.

See also 
Čičarija dialect
Slavomolisano dialect

References

Further reading 
Branimir Crljenko, Govori jugozapadnog istarskog dijalekta Rovinjštine, 1995, Čakavska rič, XXIII (1-2), pg. 113-141
Lina Pliško, Štakavsko-čakavski govori Tinjanštine. – mjesni govor Hlistića, 2007, Croatica et Slavica Iadertina, III, pg. 95-106
Lina Pliško, Romanizmi u leksemima za dom i posjed u jugozapadnome istarskome ili štakavsko-čakavskome dijalektu, 2009, Čakavska rič, XXXVII (1-2), pg. 147-159
David Mandić, Akut u jugozapadnim istarskim govorima, 2009, Hrvatski dijalektološki zbornik, 15, pg. 83-109
Lina Pliško, The Butori dialect, 2011, Fluminensia: časopis za filološka istraživanja, 22 (2), pg. 127–135
Lina Pliško, A Recent Research in the Local Dialect of Ližnjan, 2011, Filologija, 55, pg. 105-115
David Mandić, The Accentuation of Nouns in the Premantura Dialects, 2013, Hrvatski dijalektološki zbornik, 18, pg. 187-202
David Mandić, The Accentuation of I-Verbs in the Local Dialect of Banjole, 2014, Rasprave: Časopis Instituta za hrvatski jezik i jezikoslovlje, 39 (1), pg. 693-82
David Mandić, The accentual system of the Pomer dialect: Analogical processes, 2015, Tabula: časopis Filozofskog fakulteta, Sveučilište Jurja Dobrile u Puli, No.13/1, pg. 63-90
Lina Pliško, The dialect of Banki – addendum to the description of the Poreč dialects, 2017, Rasprave: Časopis Instituta za hrvatski jezik i jezikoslovlje, 43 (2), pg. 443–456
Lina Pliško, The local dialect of Vošteni, 2017, Jezikoslovlje, 18 (2), pg. 347-356

External links 

Dialects of Serbo-Croatian
Croatian language
Istria